The Rural Municipality of Cana No. 214 is a rural municipality (RM) in the Canadian province of Saskatchewan within Census Division No. 5 and  Division No. 1. It is located in the southeast portion of the province.

History 
The RM of Cana No. 214 incorporated as a rural municipality on December 13, 1909.

Heritage properties
There is one historical site located within the RM.
Home Quarter of the Wotherspoon Farm - Constructed in 1905, this homestead is located 4 miles north of Melville on Highway 47.  The homestead is being restored as a historical site.

Demographics 

Government 
The RM of Cana No. 214 is governed by an elected municipal council and an appointed administrator that meets on the second Tuesday of every month. The reeve of the RM is Robert Almasi while its administrator is Kali Tourney. The RM's office is located in Melville.

Transportation 
Melville Municipal Airport is located within the rural municipality.

References 

C

Division No. 5, Saskatchewan